Konkan is a region of India.

Konkan may also refer to:

Konkan, Burkina Faso, village in the Sidéradougou Department of Comoé Province
Konkan division, one of the 6 administrative divisions of Maharashtra
HMIS Konkan (J228), Bangor-class minesweepers built for the Royal Navy

See also
Concan, Texas
Kon Kan